Elin Nyman (born 30 January 1991) is a Swedish footballer midfielder who played for Mallbackens IF.

External links 
 
 Profile at Swedish Football Association (SvFF) 

1991 births
Living people
Swedish women's footballers
Mallbackens IF players
QBIK players
Damallsvenskan players
Women's association football midfielders